Anthonny Sitraka Ralefy (born July 10, 1995) is a Malagasy swimmer. He competed at the 2016 Summer Olympics in the men's 100 metre butterfly event; his time of 54.72 seconds in the heats did not qualify him for the semifinals.

References

1995 births
Living people
Malagasy male swimmers
Olympic swimmers of Madagascar
Swimmers at the 2016 Summer Olympics
Male butterfly swimmers